The Essential Foo Fighters is a greatest hits album released on October 28, 2022 by American rock band Foo Fighters. It is part of Sony Music's The Essential series. It was the first Foo Fighters release after the death of the band's drummer Taylor Hawkins on March 25, 2022.

Reception
The album debuted at number eight on Billboard's Top Album Sales chart, making it the first in the Essential series to reach the top ten of that chart. It also debuted at number 42 on the Billboard 200. In a review by the German edition of Rolling Stone, Kristina Baum stated that "With a new hits compilation which now bears the more modest name The Essential, it becomes clear in 2022 what has happened in 13 more years of band history" and that in "12 to 15 years another Foo Fighters Best Of could probably be released without any problems. Could it still be the end of the Foo Fighters chapter due to the sad circumstances ? It would be a shame". Baum also rated the album four out of five stars.

A review by Drew's Reviews stated that "I suspect The Essential Foo Fighters will sell well", but was critical that some tracks were omitted from the album: "Seriously, how do you leave out "Congregation" off Sonic Highways? In fact nothing off Sonic Highways. Weird." Drew's Reviews also noted that it is missing the song "Run" from the Concrete and Gold album which is only represented by one song, "The Sky Is a Neighborhood". A review by AllMusic was more positive stating that 13 years since the band's last Greatest Hits album Foo Fighters have had an additional four Top 10 albums which provide a "fair chunk" on The Essential Foo Fighters and that "The end result is that The Essential Foo Fighters winds up being a stronger comp than its predecessor".

Track listing

Personnel
Foo Fighters
 Dave Grohl – lead vocals, guitars, drums, bass guitar, producer
 Pat Smear – guitar, producer
 Chris Shiflett – guitar, backing vocals, producer
 Nate Mendel – bass guitar, producer
 Taylor Hawkins – drums, cowbell, lead vocals and rhythm guitar on "Cold Day in the Sun", backing vocals, producer
 Rami Jaffee – keyboards, piano, producer

Charts

References

2022 greatest hits albums
Foo Fighters compilation albums
Essential